Altenmarkt an der Triesting (Central Bavarian: Oitnmorkt aun da Triasding) is a town in the district of Baden in Lower Austria in Austria.

Population

Climate

References

External links 

 
 Topothek Altenmarkt/Triesting historical image material, located, tagged and dated

Cities and towns in Baden District, Austria